Prespa is a region shared between the Republic of North Macedonia, Albania and Greece.

Prespa may also refer to:

Lake Prespa, two lakes on the border between North Macedonia, Albania and Greece
Prespa (medieval town), an important medieval Bulgarian town
Prespa (village), Bulgaria
Prespa, Croatia, a village
Prespa Glacier, Livingston Island, Antarctica
Prespa Birlik, a Swedish football club from Malmö

See also
Prespes, a municipality in Greece
The Prespa agreement, an agreement to resolve the Macedonia naming dispute